Eva Blond is a German television series that follows the detective Eva Blond (Corinna Harfouch) and her colleague Alyans (Erdal Yıldız). It aired from 2002 to 2006 on Sat.1.

See also
List of German television series

External links
 

2002 German television series debuts
2006 German television series endings
German crime television series
German-language television shows
Sat.1 original programming
2000s German police procedural television series